The Meknes Royal Military Academy (military school of Dar El-Beida before 1961) is the Moroccan Army officer initial training centre. Created by Sultan Muley Yusef in 1918 at Meknes, it is a unique military institution in North Africa, it was originally created to train the sons of the Moroccan elites close to the colonial administration to become army officers designed to lead the Moroccan troops and later become exercising administrative positions in the Makhzen like pachas, caïds or khalifas. In 1961, six years after Morocco gained its independence in 1955, it became the Royal Military Academy, since then this institution has contributed to the training of many military and administrative cadres in Morocco and Africa.

This school Has been frequented by many Moroccan military personalities such as the general Mohamed Oufkir, Mohamed Medbouh, and Ahmed Dlimi.

Origins 

Originally built by Sultan Sidi Mohammed Ben Abdellah between 1760 and 1775, within the vast Kasbah (citadel) of his great grandfather of Sultan Moulay Ismail.

The palace was later deserted after the looting that happened during the period of political instability in Morocco, known as Siba, during the reign of Sultan Sidi Abderrehman, the building was then used as a food depot and arsenal, and then became a military barrack named Kaschla of Tabor the Haraba of Sultan Moulay Hassan I then it became the officers School were Moroccan instructors were trained by  foreign, mainly European instructors.

Mission 

The Royal Military Academy's mission is to ensure the complete formation of the active officers of the Royal Moroccan Army as well as training the rifle-men for the Royal Air Force and Royal Navy. It also includes a high school that is responsible for preparing cadets candidates for the baccalaureate of secondary education.
The laureates of The Royal Military Academy can become officers in the Royal Moroccan Army, the Moroccan Royal Guard, the Royal Moroccan Gendarmerie and the Auxiliary Forces.

Education 

The Royal Military Academy offers a 4 years officer training courses in 3 fields that are Science and Technology, legal Sciences and English Language and Literature, after finishing the 4 years courses the cadets receive the "Diplôme des Etudes Universitaires et Militaires" and are commissioned to the rank of "Sous-lieutenant" or Second lieutenant in the Moroccan military.

References

See also 
 Royal Moroccan Armed Forces

Military academies of Morocco
Military of Morocco
Meknes